The Mercer Hotel, located at the corner of Mercer and Prince Streets in SoHo, Manhattan, New York City, was the second acquisition in the luxury collection of André Balazs hotels. It offers 75 guest rooms on six floors of a Romanesque revival building.

Opening in 1997, The Mercer is the sister hotel to Hollywood's Chateau Marmont.

History 
Built in 1890 for John Jacob Astor II, the six-story, 84,000 square foot brick building has been cited by the New York City Landmarks Preservation Commission as an example of the Romanesque Revival period. Architect William Schickel, known for his extensive work on behalf of the Archdiocese of New York, designed the building as offices for the vast Astor family holdings, resulting in a façade considerably more ornate than its industrial neighbors. Prior to its conversion, the building served as artists' lofts and studios, for which the hotel has now become known.

Design 

The overall aesthetic allows The Mercer to be "the first hotel to offer an authentic taste of loft living", an urban signature that is completely original to New York.

Parisian designer Christian Liaigre ensured all furnishings were kept original and exclusive to the hotel. Liaigre created a modernist interior with an emphasis on harmonized proportions and subtle color palettes.

The Mercer Kitchen 

In 1998, The Mercer Kitchen opened as a 170-seat restaurant located over two levels of The Mercer hotel. Chef Jean-Georges Vongerichten was recruited by André Balazs as the head of restaurant and food service for the property.

The Mercer Kitchen, adjacent to the hotel lobby, has a 40-seat street-level café. The lower level features a 160-seat main dining room that lies beneath the streets of SoHo. The restaurant features an open kitchen for guests to watch the preparation of their meals. Upstairs, the casual café serves breakfast, lunch and dinner daily.

The Mercer Kitchen provides room service throughout the hotel while the upper level café serves breakfast and lunch daily.

References

External links 
 

Hotels in Manhattan
SoHo, Manhattan
Romanesque Revival architecture in New York City